This article contains information about the literary events and publications of 1693.

Events
February 27 – March 17 – John Dunton publishes The Ladies' Mercury in London, the first periodical specifically for women.
March – William Congreve's first play, the comedy The Old Bachelor, is performed at the Theatre Royal, Drury Lane in London.
May – William Bradford prints the first book in New York, George Keith's New-England's Spirit of Persecution Transmitted to Pennsylvania.
July 29 – Anthony Wood is condemned in the vice-chancellor's court of the University of Oxford for libels against Edward Hyde, 1st Earl of Clarendon. He is fined and banished from the university until he recants. The offending pages are burned.
October – Congreve's comedy The Double Dealer is first performed at Drury Lane.
unknown dates
Joseph Addison addresses an early poem to John Dryden.
Swedish scholar Petter Salan publishes in Upsala Fortissimorum pugilum Egilli et Asmundi historiam antqvo gothico sermone exaratam, the first printed edition of the 14th century Egils saga einhenda ok Ásmundar berserkjabana.
Venetian sea-captain Julije Balović compiles Pratichae Schrivaneschae, including a five-language multilingual glossary.
London printer William Anderton is hanged for treason at Tyburn for producing two anonymous Jacobite pamphlets.

New books

Fiction
The Genuine Remains of Dr. Thomas Barlow (posthumous)
Li Yu (李漁, probable author) – The Carnal Prayer Mat (written 1657)
The Third Part of the Pilgrim's Progress (anonymous)
Catherine Trotter (or Catherine Trotter Cockburn) – Olinda's Adventures; or, The Amours of a Young Lady
Sir Thomas Urquhart and Peter Anthony Motteux – first complete English translation of Rabelais' Gargantua and Pantagruel
Vertue Rewarded

Drama
John Bancroft – Henry the Second, King of England; With the death of Rosamond
William Congreve
The Old Bachelor
The Double Dealer
Thomas D'Urfey – The Richmond Heiress, or A Woman Once in the Right
Henry Higden – The Wary Widow, or Sir Noisy Parrot
George Powell – A Very Good Wife (adapted from Richard Brome's The City Wit and The Court Beggar)
Elkanah Settle – The New Athenian Comedy (published)
Thomas Southerne – The Maid's Last Prayer, or Any Rather Than Fail
Thomas Wright – The Female Virtuosos

Poetry
John Dryden – Examen Poeticum: Being the Third Part of Miscellany Poems (anthology)

Non-fiction
John Dennis – The Impartial Critick
John Dryden – A Discourse Concerning the Origin and Progress of Satire
John Evelyn – The Compleat Gard'ner
August Hermann Francke – Manuductio ad lectionem Scripturae Sacrae
Robert Gould – The Corruption of the Times by Money
John Locke – Some Thoughts Concerning Education
Cotton Mather – Wonders of the Invisible World
William Penn – An Essay towards the Present and Future Peace of Europe by the Establishment of a European Dyet, Parliament or Estates
Thomas Rymer – A Short View of Tragedy
Gabrielle Suchon – Traité de la morale et de la politique (On Morality and Politics)
Samuel Wesley – The Life of Our Blessed Lord

Births
March 5 – Johann Jakob Wettstein, Swiss theologian (died 1754)
May 10 – John Fox, English biographer (died 1763)
June 17 – Johann Georg Walch, German theologian (died 1775)
Unknown dates
Fray Casimiro Diaz, O.S.A., Spanish Augustinian friar and historian (died 1746)
Arthur Young, English religious writer and cleric (1759)
probable – Eliza Haywood, English dramatist, journalist and novelist (died 1756)

Deaths
February 7 – Paul Pellisson, French lawyer and author (born 1624)
April 9 – Roger de Rabutin, Comte de Bussy, French memoirist (born 1618)
May 25 – Madame de La Fayette, French writer (born 1634)
May 27 – John Spencer, English scholar and cleric (born 1630)
August (end) – Charles Blount, English deist author (suicide, born 1654)
September 9 – Ihara Saikaku (井原西鶴), Japanese poet and author of "floating-world" fiction (born 1642)

References

 
Years of the 17th century in literature